This is a list of films which have placed number one at the weekend box office for the year 2012 in Colombia

References 

Colombia
2012 in Colombia